Burlingame School District is a public school district in Burlingame, California, in the San Francisco Bay Area. Its schools serve students in kindergarten through 8th grade. It has control over 7 schools.

History
On Friday, May 30, 2008, the Burlingame School District's board voted to make Dianne Tallarico, the superintendent of the Santa Monica-Malibu Unified School District, the superintendent of the district.

Schools
Schools within the district are Burlingame Intermediate School (6th–8th), Franklin Elementary School, Hoover Elementary School, Lincoln Elementary School, McKinley Elementary School, Roosevelt Elementary School, and Washington Elementary School.  Most of the schools have received at least one California Distinguished School Award.

References

Further reading
 Gonzales, Neil and Kimberly S. Wetzel. San Mateo County Times at the Oakland Tribune. December 2, 2008. Article ID: 11122678. "So many California children are seeking subsidized school meals that funds to[...]Given the state's financial crisis, Burlingame School District officials[...]"
 Mills-Faraudo, T.S. "School district playing it safe." San Mateo County Times. October 11, 2003. "Playing it safe Fear of large future expenses has Burlingame School District[...]Caryn Becker, administrator for the California Department of Education, said the[...]"
 Morente, Christine. "District links students with cyber charter." San Mateo County Times. August 17, 2004. "About 20 of the region's students have enrolled in the California Virtual[...]In July, the Burlingame School District agreed to a two-year partnership with[...]"

External links

 Official Burlingame School District web site

Burlingame, California
School districts in San Mateo County, California